Morgana Robinson's The Agency is a British mockumentary about fictional talent agency Mann Management, with impressions by Morgana Robinson. In a seven-part show, Robinson plays the roster of talent agent Vincent Mann. It was broadcast on BBC Two from September 2016.

The premise of the programme is that Vincent has allowed a documentary crew access to his celebrity clients, including Miranda Hart, Natalie Cassidy, Russell Brand, Joanna Lumley, Gregg Wallace, Mel and Sue, Danny Dyer and Adele, all of whom are played by Robinson. Critical reception was largely positive.

The show's additional cast members include Cavan Clerkin, Oliver Maltman, Terry Mynott, Matthew Steer, Cariad Lloyd and Matt Berry.

Reception 
Robinson has received praise for her impersonations. Lucy Mangan of The Guardian says the programme "is just what we need in this strife-strewn year." In comparing it to Rory Bremner's political satire which he describes as "sharp", Mat Baylis of the Daily Express describes the show as "sharp, too, but in a less appealing way."The Telegraph rated it three stars out of five.

References

External links 
 
 

2016 British television series debuts
2010s British comedy television series
BBC high definition shows
BBC television comedy
English-language television shows
British mockumentary television series